The Toronto Film Critics Association Award for Best Supporting Actor is one of the annual awards given by the Toronto Film Critics Association.

Winners

2000s

2010s

2020s

References

External links
 Toronto Film Critics Association - Past Award Winners

Film awards for supporting actor